The Laurel Micropolitan Statistical Area is a micropolitan statistical area (μSA) in southeastern Mississippi that covers two counties - Jasper and Jones. The 2010 census placed the Laurel micropolitan area population at 84,823, though as of 2019, estimates indicate the population has slightly decreased to 84,481.

Counties
Jasper
Jones

Communities

Incorporated places
Bay Springs
Ellisville
Heidelberg
Laurel (Principal City)
Louin
Montrose
Sandersville
Soso

Unincorporated places
Eastabuchie
Garlandville
Moselle
Moss
Ovett
Paulding
Rose Hill
Sharon
Stringer
Vossburg

Demographics
As of the census of 2000, there were 83,107 people, 30,983 households, and 22,507 families residing within the μSA. The racial makeup of the μSA was 65.73% White, 32.13% African American, 0.32% Native American, 0.22% Asian, 0.01% Pacific Islander, 1.12% from other races, and 0.47% from two or more races. Hispanic or Latino of any race were 1.67% of the population.

The median income for a household in the μSA was $26,614, and the median income for a family was $32,208. Males had a median income of $27,728 versus $18,333 for females. The per capita income for the μSA was $13,855.

See also
List of metropolitan areas in Mississippi
List of micropolitan areas in Mississippi
List of cities in Mississippi
List of towns and villages in Mississippi
List of census-designated places in Mississippi
List of United States metropolitan areas

References

 
Geography of Jasper County, Mississippi
Geography of Jones County, Mississippi